The Fourth Michigan Territorial Council was a meeting of the legislative body governing Michigan Territory, known formally as the Legislative Council of the Territory of Michigan. The council met in Detroit in two regular sessions between May 11, 1830, and March 4, 1831, during the terms of Lewis Cass and George B. Porter as territorial governor.

Leadership and organization 

Abraham Edwards was president of the council, Edmund A. Brush secretary, and William Meldrum sergeant-at-arms.

Members 

A January 1827 act of the United States Congress provided for the direct election of a 13-member legislative council by the people of the territory; the same act gave the council responsibility for determining the apportionment of seats.
The council apportioned the seats as follows in an 1828 act:

Notes

References 
 
 
 
 

004
1830 in Michigan Territory
1831 in Michigan Territory
Michigan
Michigan